Island Falls is a census-designated place (CDP) and the primary village in the town of Island Falls, Aroostook County, Maine, United States. It is in the northwest part of the town, situated on the West Branch Mattawamkeag River, part of the Penobscot River watershed. U.S. Route 2 passes through the village, leading northeast  to Houlton and south  to Mattawamkeag. Maine State Route 159 has its eastern terminus at U.S. in the center of Island Falls and leads west  to Patten. Interstate 95 passes just west of the village of Island Falls, with access from Exit 276 (Route 159); I-95 leads northeast to Houlton and southwest  to Bangor.

Island Falls was first listed as a CDP prior to the 2020 census.

Demographics

References 

Census-designated places in Aroostook County, Maine
Census-designated places in Maine